The Snitch Cartel is a 2011 Colombian crime film directed by Carlos Moreno. The film was selected as the Colombian entry for the Best Foreign Language Oscar at the 85th Academy Awards but did not make the final shortlist.

The film, like the 2008 Caracol TV series El Cartel, is based on the 2008 novel by the same name by Andrés López López, alias Florecita ("Little Flower"), a former drug dealer who, while in prison, wrote the fictionalized account of his experiences in the Cali Cartel and of what happened within the Norte del Valle Cartel.

Plot
Two friends enter the illegal drugs business, one of them is a lower class boy, Martin, alias Strawberry, a smart and skilled young man seeking to earn money to gain the attention of his childhood love, Sophia.
His new boss, Óscar Cadena, makes a plan to take down the powerful Medellin Cartel, that is headed by the infamous don Pablo Escobar, while Martin moves up fast in the syndicate, becoming a vital part of the growing North Valley Cartel, he begins a turbulent life in the midst of a cartel war which he is uncanny to take part in, forcing him to move to Mexico looking for allies while struggles between the money and power that he now owns, and becoming a sapo (snitch) for the DEA, to protect his beloved Sofia.

Cast
 Manolo Cardona as Martin
 Tom Sizemore as DEA Agent Sam Mathews
 Juana Acosta as Sofia
 Kuno Becker as Damian
 Diego Cadavid as Pepe Cadena
 Robinson Díaz as "El Cabo"
 Julian Arango as Guadana
 Andrés Parra as Anestesia
 Fernando Solórzano as Oscar Cadena
 Juan Pablo Raba as Pirulo
 Ilja Rosendahl as Prison Guard
 Jhonny Rivera as Antonio Villegas
 Pedro Armendáriz, Jr. as Mexican Drug Lord Modesto

Associated media
In addition to the aforementioned 2008 book that inspired both the 2011 film and  the 2008 TV series, Lopez has written several additional books about his and his associates' experiences in the drug trade.

See also
 List of submissions to the 85th Academy Awards for Best Foreign Language Film
 List of Colombian submissions for the Academy Award for Best Foreign Language Film

References

External links
 

2011 films
2011 crime films
Colombian crime films
2010s Spanish-language films
Films about Colombian drug cartels
Films about Mexican drug cartels
2010s Mexican films